Barun Mukherji may refer to:

 Barun Mukherji (politician) (born 1933), Indian politician
 Barun Mukherji (cinematographer), Indian cinematographer